Microhadrestia is a genus of flies in the family Stratiomyidae.

Species
Microhadrestia minuta Lindner, 1943

References

Stratiomyidae
Brachycera genera
Taxa named by Erwin Lindner
Diptera of South America